Hit List is a 1989 action–thriller movie directed by William Lustig. The tagline for the movie was: "They attacked the wrong woman... They kidnapped the wrong child... And they made the wrong man their target." The film was produced by Cinetel Films and was distributed in US theaters by New Line Cinema and in Canadian theaters by Cineplex Odeon Films and on VHS format by RCA/Columbia Pictures Home Video, but has been out of print for some time. As of December 26, 2009, Sony has not announced any plans to release a DVD of the movie.

Plot
Gangster boss Vic Luca (Rip Torn) is scheduled to appear in court and so hires a hit man/shoe salesman Chris Caleek (Lance Henriksen) to kill the witnesses. He has a mole in the police force who tells him names and locations of the witnesses. Unfortunately, during the last hit, the professional killer enters the wrong house. When owner Jack Collins comes home, he finds his pregnant wife unconscious in the kitchen, his friend dead in the living room and his son kidnapped. Wanting Luca to believe he has the real witness' son, the authorities take Collins into custody. But Collins manages to escape and takes things into his own hands.

Cast
Jan-Michael Vincent as Jack Collins
Leo Rossi as Frank DeSalvo
Lance Henriksen as Chris Caleek
Charles Napier as Tom Mitchum
Rip Torn as Vic Luca
Harold Sylvester as Brian Armstrong
Jere Burns as Jared Riley
Junior Richard as Kenny Collins
Harreit Hall as Sandy Collins
Ken Lerner as Gravenstein
Jack Andreozzi as Abe Fasio
Nick Barbaro as Mario
Lou Bonacki as Johnson
Barry Brener as the doctor
Geoff Brewer as Brock
Richard E. Butler as Wink
Christopher Carroll as the priest
Robert A. Ferretti as Vincent Carelli
John F. Goff as the prosecutor
John Greene as Burke
Margaret Gwenver as the judge
Lisa M. Hansen as the shoe store clerk
Dennis Junt as the reporter
Lauri Landry as Connie Wayne
Scott Lincoln as Paulie
Jason Lustig as Gravenstein’s Assistant
Vic Manni as George
Felice Orlandi as Joey DeSalvo
Frank Pesce as Quigley
Pearl Shear as Mrs. Gulliver
John Paul Vetturini as Frank Jr.

In a 2019 interview, director William Lustig said Jan-Michael Vincent was drinking during the shoot, even though the actor was hired because he told them he had just finished rehab:"When we met him to do Hit List he had been in a recovery program and he was telling us that his drinking days were finished. And he looked great. At the time he was young enough that when he stopped drinking he immediately looked good again. He came in, he looked good, he assured us he wasn’t drinking, so we hired him. Literally the very first day of shooting I smelled alcohol on his breath.But I have to say, for the most part he was a functioning alcoholic."

References

External links

1989 films
1980s action thriller films
1980s crime action films
Films directed by William Lustig
American action thriller films
American crime action films
CineTel Films films
1989 drama films
1980s English-language films
1980s American films